The 1907 Paris–Roubaix was the 12th edition of the Paris–Roubaix, a classic one-day cycle race in France. The single day event was held on 31 March 1907 and stretched  from Paris to its end in a velodrome in Roubaix. The winner was Georges Passerieu from France.

Results

References

Paris–Roubaix
Paris-Roubaix
Paris-Roubaix
Paris-Roubaix
Paris–Roubaix